The 1978 Nevada gubernatorial election occurred on November 7, 1978. Incumbent Democratic governor Mike O'Callaghan was term limited. Republican nominee Robert List was elected Governor of Nevada, defeating Democratic nominee Robert E. Rose. Jack Lund Schofield unsuccessfully sought the Democratic nomination.

Results

References

1978
Nevada
Gubernatorial
November 1978 events in the United States